Bulgarisation, also known as Bulgarianisation is the spread of Bulgarian culture beyond the Bulgarian ethnic space. Historically, unsuccessful assimilation efforts in Bulgaria were primarily directed at Muslims, most notably Bulgarian Turks, but non-Islamic groups have also faced assimilation.

History

Ottoman Rule
Under Ottoman rule, much of the expansion of the Bulgarian ethnic group was reversed. While the Ottoman Empire provided for some cultural and religious autonomy under the "Millet System", and Bulgarians were briefly granted their own Bulgarian Millet, Bulgarians were no longer politically dominant in their own lands. While the Ottomans did not generally require Bulgarians to convert to Islam, the empire did enforce the Jizya tax and other forms of discrimination on non-Muslims (such as the Devshirme). Those Bulgarians who converted to Islam but retained their Slavic language and customs became known as Pomaks (though many still identified as "Bulgarian"). A sub-set of these converts to Islam also assimilated into the Turkish ethnic group. Between that assimilation and the settlement of many Turkish people in Bulgaria, much of modern day Bulgaria had an ethnic Turkish Muslim majority prior to Bulgarian independence (see 1861 map below).

The Principality and Tsardom

Following the decisive defeat of the Ottoman Empire in the Russo-Turkish War (1877–1878), Bulgaria at last regained independence, though initially it remained under limited Ottoman suzerainty. Following the Ottoman defeat, both Russian occupation authorities during and immediately after the war as well as Bulgarian administrators, attempted to remove traces of Ottoman rule from the area where possible. The Bulgarian nation was ideally to consist of Slavic Orthodox Christians. In spite of treaty obligations requiring Bulgaria to protect its Muslim subjects, Islamic buildings of many kinds were destroyed (including mosques, schools, and homes).

Assimilation efforts continued thereafter, and many Muslims left Bulgaria. In the first post-independence census conducted by the Principality of Bulgaria 26.3% of respondents declared their mother tongue to be Turkish/Gagauz, but by 1934 (the final census conducted by the Tsardom of Bulgaria) only 9.7% of respondents declared themselves to be ethnically Turkish and information on the Turkic Gagauz population was not collected. This precipitous drop in the Turkish population of Bulgaria meant that by the time of the People's Republic of Bulgaria, many formerly Turkish-majority areas had become majority ethnically Bulgarian, because of the emigration to Turkey.

People's Republic of Bulgaria

While the Soviet Union initially forced Bulgaria to recognize many minority ethnic groups in the country, over time the Bulgarian People's Republic dropped that recognition and leaned more heavily into Bulgarian nationalism. Following the death of Stalin in 1954, Todor Zhivkov rose to leadership of the Bulgarian Communist Party and the country by extension. Under Zhivkov, the conception of the Bulgarian nation was further developed and new "Bulgarianisation" campaigns were carried out.

The idea that Bulgarian Turks shared a Slavic and Christian origin with the Bulgarians originated in the 1960s during Zhivkov's rule. The regime in Sofia often fell back on claims that the Ottoman Empire had planned and executed the "Islamization" and "Turkification" of Bulgaria. In 1985, a senior Bulgarian Communist Party official proclaimed that “The Bulgarian nation has no parts of other peoples and nations”.

Notable among the Bulgarianisation campaigns of the Zhivkov era was the "Revival Process", a 1980s attempt to assimilate the Turkish population of Bulgaria. During the "Revival Process" assimilation efforts increased and those Muslims who had not already been made to adopt new sufficiently Bulgarian names in place of their original Turkish or Islamic names were made to do so. The "Revival Process" was followed by the "Big Excursion which saw the expulsion of over 300,000 Bulgarian Turks from the country (and subsequent return of some of the victims). Following the fall of Todor Zhivkov, the "Revival Process" was reversed and people were free to revert to previous names or adopt the names they wished. Regardless, some of those who had been made to adopt a "Bulgarian" name continued using both it and their restored name.

Modern Day
Despite historic tensions with its Muslim minority, the current constitution of Bulgaria provides for freedom of religion, though it does recognize the Bulgarian Orthodox Church as the "traditional religion" of Bulgaria. While draconian forced assimilationist policies are no longer in place, the idea of a planned "genocide" carried out by the Ottomans against ethnic Bulgarians persists.

Specific Ethnic Groups

Macedonians

The relationship between the Bulgarian and Macedonian ethnic groups has been controversial in both Bulgaria and Macedonia. Many both in Bulgaria and abroad (see above 1861 French map) have seen Macedonians as merely a regional grouping of the Bulgarian ethnic group. Indeed, the emergence of a separate Macedonian ethnic identity occurred in the 20th century.

Although at the 1934 census, no Macedonians were recorded in Bulgaria, at the 1946 and 1956 censuses, the results indicated their number of 180,000. Regardless of whether Macedonians could even be "Bulgarianised" ipso facto, in the ten years after the discontinuation of the teaching of Macedonian language in Bulgaria in 1958, the population self-identifying as "Macedonian" fell rapidly to 1,600.

Vlachs
Bulgarisation has also affected the Vlachs (Romanians in Bulgaria), who were largely assimilated.

See also 
 Anti-Turkism
 Cultural assimilation
 Islam in Bulgaria
 Freedom of religion in Bulgaria
 Human rights in Bulgaria
 Turks in Bulgaria

References

Bibliography

Cultural assimilation
Slavicization
Human rights in Bulgaria
Islam in Bulgaria
+
Pomaks

Bulgarian irredentism